Phrynetopsis thomensis is a species of beetle in the family Cerambycidae. It was described by Karl Jordan in 1903. It is known from São Tomé and Príncipe.

References

Phrynetini
Beetles described in 1903